Peter Phelps (born 1960) is an Australian actor, singer and writer.

Peter Phelps may also refer to:
 Peter Phelps (politician) (born 1968), Australian politician
 Peter Phelps (cricketer) (1909–1986), English cricketer
 Peter Phelps (swimmer) (born 1945), Australian former swimmer